Dallin is a medieval surname of Low German/Westphalia origin, a variation of Dahl. The suffix -lin denotes the namebearer's locale or occupation. Unlike some of the other Dahl variants, Dallin is uncommon to Scandinavian countries. Dallin is also uncommon as a given name. 
 
People with the surname include:
 Sara Dallin (born 1961), English singer and songwriter from the pop group Bananarama
 Alexander Dallin (1924–2000), American professor at Columbia and Stanford universities  (son of David Dallin)
 David Dallin (1889–1962), American expert on Soviet affairs (father of Alexander Dallin, husband of Lilia Estrin Dallin)
 Lilia Estrin Dallin (1898–1981) (a.k.a. Lola Estrin, Paulsen, Lilya Ginzberg),  Russian Trotskyist  (second wife of David Dallin)
 Cyrus Edwin Dallin (1861–1944), American sculptor and Olympic archer

People with the given name include:
 Dallin Applebaum, American songwriter, pianist, vocalist and music producer
 Dallin H. Oaks (born 1932), Member of the First Presidency of the Church of Jesus Christ of Latter-day Saints
 Dallin Leavitt (born 1994), American football player
 Dallin Watene-Zelezniak (born 1995), Rugby League player

References